Kulmas (Qolmas) is a rural locality (a selo) in Inzersky Selsoviet, Beloretsky District, Bashkortostan, Russia. The population was 18 as of 2010. There is 1 street.

Geography 
Kulmas is located 132 km northwest of Beloretsk (the district's administrative centre) by road. Usakly is the nearest rural locality.

References 

Rural localities in Beloretsky District